Schneider House may refer to:

in Canada
Schneider Haus, a museum in Kitchener, Ontario

in the United States
Charles W. Schneider House, St. Paul, Minnesota, listed on the National Register of Historic Places (NRHP)
R. B. Schneider House, Fremont, Nebraska, NRHP-listed
Schneider's Opera House, Snyder, Nebraska, NRHP-listed
Frederick Schneider House, Erie, Pennsylvania, NRHP-listed

See also
Schneider Triangle, Washington, DC, NRHP-listed, a set of houses
Henry Schneider Building, Springfield, Missouri, NRHP-listed
J. P. Schneider Store, Austin, Texas, NRHP-listed
Schneider Hotel, Pampa, Texas, NRHP-listed in Gray County